Spyridium scabridum is a species of flowering plant in the family Rhamnaceae and is endemic to Kangaroo Island in South Australia. It is a slender, erect shrub or small tree with oblong or narrowly egg-shaped leaves, and heads of sparsely hairy, white to cream-coloured flowers surrounded by densely hairy floral leaves.

Description
The edges of the leaves are turned down or rolled under, the upper surface hairy at first, the lower surface felt-like and densely covered with star-shaped hairs.

Taxonomy
This species was first formally described in 1889 by Ralph Tate who gave it the name Cryptandra scabrida in the Transactions, proceedings and report, Royal Society of South Australia. In 2012, Jürgen Kellermann and William Robert Barker changed the name to Spyridium scabridum in the Journal of the Adelaide Botanic Gardens. The specific epithet (scabridum) means "somewhat scabrous".

Distribution and habitat
Spyridium scabridum grows in heath and open mallee scrubland on Kangaroo Island, mainly in the interior of the island.

References

scabridum
Rosales of Australia
Flora of South Australia
Taxa named by Ralph Tate
Plants described in 1889